Rølvaag, Rølvåg or Rolvaag is a Norwegian surname. Notable people with the surname include:

Karl Rolvaag (1913–1990), U.S. politician, son of Ole Edvart 
Mette Henriette Martedatter Rølvåg (born 1990), Norwegian musician
Ole Edvart Rølvaag (1876–1931), American author
O. E. Rolvaag House, home of Ole Edvart
Sander Rølvåg (born 1990), Norwegian curler

Norwegian-language surnames